Nagia godfreyi is a species of moth in the family Erebidae. It is found in Thailand.

References

Nagia
Moths described in 1924
Moths of Asia